Castles in the Sky or Castle in the Sky may refer to:

Film and television
 Castles in the Sky (film), a 2014 British fact-based television drama
 Castle in the Sky, a 1986 animated film directed by Hayao Miyazaki featuring a floating city
 "Castles in the Sky", an episode in the 9th season of Arthur

Music
 "Castles in the Sky" (song), a 2000 single by Ian Van Dahl
 Castle in the Sky, a 1977 album by David Castle
 "Castles in the Sky", a song by Pharaoh from Bury the Light, 2012
 "Castle in the Sky", a song by DJ Satomi
 "Castle in the Sky", a song by Tkay Maidza from Tkay, 2016

See also
 Novoland: The Castle in the Sky, a 2016 Chinese television series
 Castle in the Clouds, a mansion and mountaintop estate in New Hampshire
 Castle in the Air (disambiguation)
 Floating city (science fiction)